George Augustus Dana (1840–1911) was an Ontario contractor and political figure. He represented Brockville in the Legislative Assembly of Ontario from 1894 to 1898 as a Liberal member.

He was born in Brockville, Ontario, the son of Alonzo B. Dana who served three terms as mayor of Brockville. Dana served on the town council, as a water commissioner and also was mayor from 1885 to 1886. He served in the local militia and was a director of the Canadian Central Railway. Dana also wrote a number of plays.

External links 
The Canadian parliamentary companion, 1897 JA Gemmill

he Canadian men and women of the time : a handbook of Canadian biography, HJ Morgan (1898)
History Matters, Brockville & District Historical Society, March 2003 (pdf)

1840 births
1911 deaths
Mayors of Brockville
Ontario Liberal Party MPPs